Henrik Åström (born 11 January 1980) is a Swedish composer and music producer. He is the son of the Swedish archaeologist Paul Åström and owner of the record label and publishing company A-Stream Productions since 2002.

Film, television and theatre

Åström has written music for many feature films, such as the dramas Child of Grace and Cowboys and Indians by the award-winning director Ian McCrudden, Scammerhead by writer/director Dan Zukovic and Internment by writer/director Kast Hasa. One of his first film scores was for the drama Jake and Jasper – A Ferret Tale that was awarded with a 2012 Remi Award at the Worldfest-Houston International Film Festival. He has also composed the original score for two seasons of the Science Channel documentary series Secrets of the Viking Stone', directed by Peter Stormare.

In addition to his work in film and TV, Åström has written and performed experimental music for the Butoh dancer and choreographer Frauke. He composed the music and created the sound design for her theatre work Ama-No-Gawa that was performed at the National Arts Festival in Grahamstown, South Africa, in 2010, and the solo dance performance Endangered that was performed at Atalante in Gothenburg in 2012. He also composed music for the dance festival Dance Bistro that was performed in Long Beach, California, in 2013.

Studio

Åström was the owner of the recording studio A-Stream Studio at Sankt Eriksplan in Stockholm, Sweden, between 2002 and 2012. At this studio location he worked with artists such as Miss Li, Oh Laura, Erik Grönwall, Titiyo, Thomas Denver Jonsson, Annis Brander and Zooparty. Zooparty was co-produced by the former Sex Pistols member Glen Matlock.

Filmography

 Ariel Phenomenon (2022) - composer
 The American Runestone (2020) - composer
 Mango Bajito (2019) - composer
 Internment (2018) - composer
 Hope (2017) - composer
 Holding the Wire (2016) - composer
 Riddle Room (2016) - composer
 Dude, Where's My Ferret? (2015) - composer **VISFF Goldie Award Winner**
 Migration (2015) - composer
 Make Your Mark (2014) - composer
 Santa's Little Ferrets (2014) - composer
 Child of Grace (2014) - composer
 Scammerhead (2014) - composer
 My Deja Vu (2014) - composer
 Eyes Upon Waking (2014) - composer
 The Stray (2013) - composer
 The Magic Ferret (2013) - composer
 The Last Goodbye (2013) - composer
 Cowboys and Indians (2013) - composer
 The Beginning (2013) - composer
 The Gelephant (2013) - composer
 Captain Blackout (2013) - composer
 Larry Brought Lemon (2012) - composer
 Mango Bajito (2012) - composer
 Chameleon (2012) - composer
 Jake and Jasper: A Ferret Tale (2011) - composer
 Alice Wants Dessert (2011) - composer

Selected discography

 The American Runestone (Music from the Original TV Series) (2020)
 Internment (Original Motion Picture Soundtrack) (2019)
 Mango Bajito - Original Motion Picture Score (2017)
 Holding the Wire - Original Motion Picture Score (2016)
 Child of Grace - Original Motion Picture Score (2015)
 Cowboys and Indians (Original Motion Picture Soundtrack) (2013)
 Cajsa Siik, Plastic House (2012)
 Annis Brander, Glass People in the Woods (2011)
 Min Lilla Värld, Min Lilla Värld (2010)
 Kristina Westberg, Good Days (2009)
 Zooparty (feat. Glen Matlock), Re-fuse (2009)
 Charle Porter, Charlee Porter (2008)
 Annis Brander (feat. Titiyo), If it's a dead fish, it's a dead fish (2008)
 Miss Li, God Put a Rainbow in the Sky  (2007) Miss Li, Late Night Heartbroken Blues (2006)''

References

External links
Resume 25 September 2009, by: Magnus Helander
Direktpress 19 June 2010, Vol. 23, Iss. 1, p. 16, by: Camilla Käck, "Henrik Åström bjuder in till sin värld av musik"
"National Arts Festival – Ama-No-Gawa", review by Sifiso Sikhakhane, Artsmart, 24 June 2010
Rootstime, September 2011
Swedish Stereo Sep 12, 2012, "Cajsa Siik – Was I Supposed To"
Neufutur Magazine Jan 15, 2014, by: James McQuiston, "Henrik Åström Interview"
Studio Feb 22, 2017, by: Andreas Hedberg, "Så skapar den prisbelönte svensken filmmusik i Hollywood"

Living people
Swedish composers
Swedish male composers
Swedish record producers
1980 births